Gillian R. Evans is a British philosopher, and emeritus professor of medieval theology and intellectual history at University of Cambridge.

Evans was educated at King Edward VI High School for Girls, Birmingham, followed by a degree in history from St Anne's College, Oxford, and a postgraduate diploma in education. She earned her PhD from  Reading University writing about Anselm of Canterbury.

In 2002, Evans was appointed professor of medieval theology and intellectual history at Cambridge University.

Academic Freedom and Democracy
Evans is a campaigner for academic freedom and democracy. She is a member of Council for Academic Freedom and Academic Standards and qualified as a barrister to assist academics with grievances against their institutions. She regularly writes and speaks in opposition to managerialist trends in university administration. As an Emeritus Professor, she has continued relentless scrutiny of the administration of the University of Cambridge, submitting forensic contributions to many University Discussions. In a July 2020 discussion she challenged the constitutionality of the response of the University Council to the COVID-19 pandemic arguing that the powers of the Regent House, the sovereign body of the University, "were simply seized and handed over indefinitely by the Council and the General Board".

Publications  
Alan of Lille:  The Frontiers of Theology in the Later Twelfth Century (1983), Cambridge:  Cambridge.   .
The University of Cambridge: A New History (published by I.B. Tauris)

References

Living people
Members of the University of Cambridge faculty of history
Alumni of St Anne's College, Oxford
People educated at King Edward VI High School for Girls, Birmingham
Year of birth missing (living people)